Shilanabad may refer to:
 Shilanabad, Kurdistan
 Shilanabad, West Azerbaijan